Old Bering Sea is an archaeological culture associated with a distinctive, elaborate circle and dot aesthetic style and is centered on the Bering Strait region; no site is more than 1 km from the ocean. Old Bering Sea is considered, following Henry B. Collins, the initial phase of the Northern Maritime tradition.  Despite its name, several OBS sites lie on the Chukchi Sea. The temporal range of the culture is from 400 BC to possibly as late as 1300 AD. Another suggested range is from about 200 BC to 500 AD.

Discovery
The culture was initially named the "Bering Sea" culture by Canadian archaeologist Diamond Jenness in 1928 following the discovery on the Diomede Islands of distinctively decorated objects such as whaling and sealing harpoon heads. The adjective "Old" was added by Smithsonian archaeologist Henry B. Collins to distinguish the culture from younger materials with similar design elements.  Subsequent discoveries from 1925 to 1940 occurred within archaeological excavations mostly on St. Lawrence Island, and is renowned for its richly carved winged objects, employed as counterweights on atlatls (throwing boards).

The artifacts
The richly decorated objects are nearly exclusively on walrus tusk, some with distinctive color and antiquity; the decorations were applied to a very wide range of objects, many of which are recovered only in graves, some of which contain dozens of objects.

Geographic extent
The geographic extent of objects associated with the Old Bering Sea culture is skewed toward Chukotka, with the highest number of graves, over 500, near Cape Dezhneva at the two sites of Uelen and Ekven, north and south of the cape, respectively.  OBS is known from Cape Navarin to Kolchinaya Guba.  OBS sites are common on all the coasts of St. Lawrence Island, and the Diomedes; however, only isolated finds are known from the mainland of North America, at Barrow, Point Hope, Cape Espenberg and Golovnin Bay, within eastern Norton Sound.

Phases of development
Several phases of the linear and circle and dot Old Bering Sea style was formally defined by Henry Collins in 1937 on the basis of his extensive excavations at the mound sites of Mayughaaq in the vicinity of Gambell, Alaska, at the northwestern cape of St. Lawrence Island. Collins' research focused on large midden and domestic architecture with few graves located; a large cemetery was subsequently located nearby by Hans Georg Bandi in the 1960s.  An important subdivisions of Old Bering Sea is its earliest, more spare designs termed Okvik, for several mounds on an island off the east coast of St. Lawrence Island, excavated by Otto Geist. A small Okvik site, the Hillside locality, lies above the Mayughaaq mound and contains five stone slab houses reasonably well dated to 200 to 400 AD.

Excavation sites
The sites containing Old Bering Sea objects are typically large mounds and middens or cemeteries with hundreds of graves, often framed by bowhead whale mandibles and floored with wooden planks, hewn out of driftwood. Very few graves contain elaborate grave offerings; sufficiently few for some archaeologists to infer the existence of hierarchical groups, including powerful whaling captains and/or shamans, some of whom were women.

Origins
The origins of Old Bering Sea remains poorly known, although its chronology can be tentatively established from several localities across Bering Strait.  The earliest materials termed OBS are dated before 400 BC from mortuary remains at Ekven. The peak of the culture was between 200 and 600 AD, although no firm chronology is yet well-accepted by researchers. The OBS culture is believed to have developed into the Punuk culture in Siberia and to the Birnirk culture in north Alaska. The Old Bering Sea culture is also considered the earliest indication of the Thule culture.

References

Archaeological cultures of North America
Native American history of Alaska
Prehistory of the Arctic
Bering Strait